{{Infobox football club season
| club                = Negeri Sembilan
| season              =  2012
| ownertitle           = President
| owner                = Mohammad Hassan
| chrtitle             = Manager
| chairman             = Abdul Halim Abdul Latif
| mgrtitle             = Head Coach
| manager              = Azraai Khor
| stadium             =  Tuanku Abdul Rahman Stadium
| league              =  Malaysia Super League
| league result       =  6th
| cup1                = Charity Shield
| cup1 result         = Winners
| cup2                = FA Cup 
| cup2 result         = First round 
| cup3                = Malaysia Cup
| cup3 result         = Quarter-finals
| cup4                =
| cup4 result         =
| league topscorer    = Jean-Emmanuel Effa Owona (15)
| season topscorer    = Jean-Emmanuel Effa Owona (23)
| highest attendance  =  
| lowest attendance   =  
| average attendance  =  
 
|pattern_la1=_blackborder|pattern_b1=_blackcollar|pattern_ra1=_blackborder|pattern_sh1=|pattern_so1=_color_3_yellow|leftarm1=FFCC00|body1=FFCC00|rightarm1=FFCC00|shorts1=000000|socks1=FFCC00
| pattern_b2  =_blackcollar
| pattern_la2 =_blackborder
| pattern_ra2 =_blackborder
| pattern_so2 =f00
| leftarm2    = f00
| body2       = f00
| rightarm2   = f00
| shorts2     = f00
| socks2      = f00
| pattern_b3  =_blackcollar
| pattern_la3 =_blackborder
| pattern_ra3 =_blackborder
| pattern_so3 =00004d
| leftarm3    = 00004d
| body3       = 00004d
| rightarm3   = 00004d
| shorts3     = 00004d
| socks3      = 00004d
| prevseason         = 2011
| nextseason         = 2013
}}
The 2012 season was Negeri Sembilan's 7th season in Malaysia Super League since it was first introduced in 2004, the top flight of Malaysian football.

Negeri Sembilan played in the Malaysian Super League and the Malaysian FA Cup. Negeri Sembilan qualified for the Malaysia Cup, after finishing 8th in the Super League, Negeri qualified to Malaysia Cup Final for the third time in a row this time with their new coach Mohd Azraai Khor Abdullah. They won the trophy after defeating Terengganu with an epic comeback. The first goal was scored by Mohd Ashaari Shamsuddin for Terengganu in the 59th minute. Negeri used the last 10 minutes of the game to make a comeback. S. Kunanlan equalised the score in the 81st minute before Hairuddin Omar, the veteran striker hit the winning goal for Negeri with a beautiful volley in the 85th minute. Negeri ended their FA campaign Second round, defeated by Kuala Lumpur on a penalty shoot out.

Season reviewNegeri Sembilan put nine new faces including two import players to cover Hoben Jang Hoben squad challenges in Super League 2012 season. Two import players are striker from Cameroon, Jean-Emmanuel Effa Owona and defender of Brazil, Gonçalves Ferreira Marquen offered a year contract as the latest backup squad Jangs in forming a strong team and the caliber of providing high quality performances for them to compete in the league . 7 new faces in squad of the 2012 season are Mohd Zulfaizham Kamis & Ahmad Shakir Mohd Ali (Kedah), Norismaidham Ismail & Mohd Nazrin Mohd Nawi (Kuala Lumpur), Rashid Mahmud (Felda United FC), Azmeer Yusof (Pos Malaysia FC) and Badrulzaman Abdul Halim (PKNS FC). Players who remain with squad are Kaharuddin, Tengku Qayyum, Mohd Firdaus Azizul, Norhafiz Zamani, S. Kunanlan, Shahurain, Mohd Shaffik Abdul Rahman, Shukor Adan, G. Mahathevan, Qhairul Anwar, Halim Zainal, Muszaki, Idris Karim, Alif Shamsudin and Farizal Marlias. While the 8 pillars of migratory jangs is Hairuddin Omar, Farizal Harun, Aidil Zafuan, Zaquan Adha & Irwan Fadzli Idrus choose not to renew the contract and join ATM, Fakri Saarani & Aminuddin migrated to Felda United and Hasmawi Hassan to Penang FA.

Although the import players Marquen Nuquen Gocalves Ferreira played in the J-League, Japan, but he later returned to her home country to play for clubs in Division 3. This situation is contrary to the conditions of import players for the 2012 Malaysian League championship last club of the countries of Latin America, Africa and Europe must be from Division 1 or 2, while in Asia, must be Division 1. PBNS to appeal to approve the import players from Brazil but FAM was told that all appeals for import players who have technical problems are not entertained and rejected.

New Players, New Team, New Season, New Mission. Talent wins games, Teamwork wins ChampioNShips.
Source: BERNAMA

Club

Coaching Staff

Kit Manufacturers & Financial Sponsor

Player Information

Full squad

Transfers

In

Out

Loan For Malaysia Cup

Non-competitive

Pre-season

Friendly Match

Competitions

Malaysia Charity Shield

Malaysia Super League

League table

Matches

Malaysia FA Cup

Knockout stage

Malaysia Cup

Group stage

Quarter-finalsATM FA''' won 6–3 on aggregate and advanced to the Semi-finals.

Season statistics

Top scorers

Disciplinary record 

 = Number of bookings;  = Number of sending offs after a second yellow card;  = Number of sending offs by a direct red card.

References 

Negeri Sembilan FA seasons
Negeri Sembilan